The Yappar River is a river located in the Gulf Country region of Far North Queensland, Australia.

Course and features
The river rises below the Gregory Range near Esmeralda in an area of ephemeral watercourses and stony sandstone ridges lightly vegetated with Eucalyptus miniata, acacia and spinifex on the ridge tops. Further down from the ridges areas of paperbark are found. The river flows generally in a north-westerly direction through Esmeralda Station, floodplain and savannah county, almost parallel with the Clara River, through the channel country until it reaches Yappar Station where it reaches its confluence with the Norman River at the western boundary of Claraville. The Yappar has seven minor tributaries from source to mouth and descends  over its  course.

See also

References

Rivers of Far North Queensland